The Azahar Mosque, or also called the Cambodia Mosque, is a mosque in Vientiane, Laos.

History
The construction of the mosque started in 1976 and was completed in 1986.

Architecture
The mosque consists of two main buildings, which are the prayer hall and the education room. The mosque is painted gold in color for its dome and cream for its wall. The mosque sits in a complex with a total area of 700 m2.

See also
 Islam in Laos

References

1986 establishments in Laos
Buildings and structures in Vientiane
Mosques completed in 1986
Mosques in Laos